Beaver Creek is an unincorporated community in Ashe County, North Carolina, United States, located off U.S. Route 221, south of West Jefferson.

The Virginia-Carolina Railway once had service through this area. The Virginia–Carolina Railway was an interstate railroad in southwestern Virginia and northwestern North Carolina. It ran from Abingdon in Washington County, Virginia to Todd in Ashe County. The line charted a complicated course through the mountains of the area, crossing the Blue Ridge near  Mount Rogers.

References

Unincorporated communities in Ashe County, North Carolina
Unincorporated communities in North Carolina